Kimberly Ribble (born 11 August 1974) is a Canadian judoka. She competed in the women's half-heavyweight event at the 2000 Summer Olympics.

References

External links
 

1974 births
Living people
Canadian female judoka
Olympic judoka of Canada
Judoka at the 2000 Summer Olympics
Sportspeople from Hamilton, Ontario